The 1884 Canadian football season was the second season since the creation of the Ontario Rugby Football Union (ORFU) and the Quebec Rugby Football Union (QRFU) in 1883 and the first since the re-establishment of the Canadian Rugby Football Union (CRFU). The season was highlighted by the first ever Rugby Football Dominion Championship where the Montreal Football Club defeated the Toronto Football Club by a score of 30 to 0.

Canadian football news in 1884
On February 7, 1884, the Canadian Rugby Football Union was formed to provide a regulatory body for Rugby Football in Canada along with establishing a national championship game. The QRFU adopted a point based system this year, adopting the ORFU model, as opposed to the previous year where they recorded the number of tries and goals scored.

QRFU results

Quebec Challenge Cup
The Montreal Football Club and the Britannia Football Club played for the Quebec Challenge Cup. The teams proved evenly matched with Montreal only scoring one rouge in the entire game while the Brits did not score. Since Montreal did not record enough points, the game ended in a draw. Because Britannia was not able to defeat Montreal, Montreal retained their Quebec title and were declared the champions of Quebec.

ORFU results
At the beginning of the season, 14 Ontario rugby clubs were eligible to compete for the Ontario Challenge Cup. Five of these clubs either did not participate or forfeited immediately. The remaining nine teams competed in a series of sudden death matches until one undefeated team remained, being named the Ontario Rugby Challenge Cup champion.

Ontario Challenge Cup
Prior to the scheduled final between Toronto and Ottawa, Ottawa declared forfeit due to seven of their players being unable to make the trip to Toronto. Given the short notice, since the Toronto club received the telegram one day before the scheduled match, the integrity of the Ottawa club was questioned since they had at least 35 members and appeared reluctant to send a replacement team that would only lose. Since tickets had been paid for, Toronto attempted to schedule a match with Hamilton, but were refused due to the justifiably short notice. Consequently, the Toronto Football Club were Ontario Challenge Cup champions due to Ottawa's forfeit.

Dominion Championship

References

 
Canadian Football League seasons
U Sports football seasons